Pascal Bary (born April 4, 1953) is a French racehorse trainer.

He has been training since 1981, having previously worked as an assistant to François Boutin. He is based at Chantilly, Oise.

Major wins
 Dubai
 Dubai World Cup - (1) - Glória de Campeão (2010)

 France
 Grand Critérium - (1) - Way of Light (1998)
 Grand Prix de Paris - (1) - Zambezi Sun (2007)
 Poule d'Essai des Pouliches - (2) - Bluemamba (2000), Divine Proportions (2005)
 Prix d'Astarté - (2) - Field of Hope (1999), Divine Proportions (2005)
 Prix de Diane - (2) - Divine Proportions (2005), Senga (2017)
 Prix de la Forêt - (1) - Field of Hope (1999)
 Prix d'Ispahan - (2) - Highest Honor (1987), Croco Rouge (1999)
 Prix Jacques Le Marois - (1) - Six Perfections (2003)
 Prix du Jockey Club - (6) - Celtic Arms (1994), Ragmar (1996), Dream Well (1998), Sulamani (2002), Blue Canari (2004), Study of Man (2018)
 Prix Lupin - (2) - Celtic Arms (1994), Croco Rouge (1998)
 Prix Marcel Boussac - (5) - Sierra Madre (1993), Amonita (2000), Six Perfections (2002), Denebola (2003), Divine Proportions (2004)
 Prix Morny - (2) - Deep Roots (1982), Divine Proportions (2004)
 Grand Prix de Saint-Cloud - (1) - Silverwave (2016)
 Prix Saint-Alary - (1) - Brilliance (1997)
 Prix de la Salamandre - (1) - Deep Roots (1982, dead-heat)
 Prix Vermeille - (1) - Sierra Madre (1994)

 Great Britain
 1,000 Guineas - (1) - Natagora (2008)
 Cheveley Park Stakes - (1) - Natagora (2007)

 Ireland
 Irish Derby - (1) - Dream Well (1998)

 Singapore
 Singapore Airlines International Cup - (1) - Glória de Campeão (2009)

 United States
 Breeders' Cup Mile - (2) - Domedriver (2002), Six Perfections (2003)
 Breeders' Cup Turf - (1) - Miss Alleged (1991)

References
 NTRA.com

Living people
1953 births
French horse trainers